80 Million Strong (for Young American Jobs) was a coalition aiming to unite young Americans to own and direct their economic reality. The summit, taking place July 14–15, 2009 in Washington, D.C., looked at the problems that young people face in order to find constructive, long-term solutions. Stakeholders convened, proposing legislation that creates new jobs for the new economy.

Steps to doing this:
 Convening a summit of young people in Washington, DC to discuss this problem and propose solutions
 Developing federal legislation based on the summit's recommendations
 Building a grassroots coalition that truly reflects and empowers the Millennial generation

The coalition was disbanded in August 2009 after four months of operation.

Coalition 
 Mobilize.org
 Roosevelt Institution
 Student Association for Voter Empowerment
 United States Student Association
 Generation Engage
 ServeNext
 Young People For
 Advocates for Youth
 Future Majority
 Campus Camp Wellstone
 The League of Young Voters
 Campus Progress
 Hip Hop Caucus
 Declare Yourself
 Concord Coalition
 Voto Latino
 HeadCount
 Pike County Youth Coalition
 The Nation
 Rock The Vote
 Earth Aid
 National Network for Youth
 George Washington University's Graduate School of Political Management
 ChangeUpMag.com
 George Washington University's Semester in Washington Politics
 Young People First

Background 
 Youth unemployment is nearly 8% higher than the national average, with a 17.3% unemployment rate for those 16-24, according to the Bureau of Labor Statistics’ May data.
 Statistics indicate that people ages 16–24 represent one-third of the unemployed, even though they make up 15 percent of the nation's work force.
 African Americans and Hispanics are even more adversely affected by the crisis, with unemployment rates among 16- to 19-year-olds eclipsing 30%.
 Young people amass over $2000 in credit card debt by the age of 24.
 African American 20- to 24-year-olds are unemployed at a rate of 25.1
 Additionally, 30% of young people are uninsured, the highest of any age group.
 Despite common myths, the most common reason that young people do not hold insurance is because s/he cannot afford it and/or does not have access via an employer-sponsored plan.

References 

American advisory organizations